Tony Heleno da Costa Pinho (born 15 December 1983 in Cuiabá, Mato Grosso), simply Tony, is a Brazilian footballer who played as a defender, most notably for Naval in Portugal and Bangkok United in Thailand.

References

External links

CBF data 

1983 births
Living people
People from Cuiabá
Brazilian footballers
Association football defenders
Avaí FC players
Primeira Liga players
Associação Naval 1º de Maio players
S.C. Beira-Mar players
FC Kamza players
Brazilian expatriate footballers
Expatriate footballers in Portugal
Expatriate footballers in Albania
Brazilian expatriate sportspeople in Portugal
Brazilian expatriate sportspeople in Albania
Expatriate footballers in Thailand
Sportspeople from Mato Grosso